Yurkovich is a surname. Notable people with the surname include:

David Yurkovich (born 1964), American independent writer and illustrator of comic books and graphic novels
Rachel Yurkovich (born 1986), American javelin thrower
Stephen Yurkovich, American electrical engineer
Tom Yurkovich (born 1935), American former ice hockey goaltender and Olympian